Burischar Union is a union of Hathazari Upazila of Chittagong District.

Geography

Area of Burischar: 946 acres (3.83 km2).

Location 

North: Halda River

East: Chandgaon Thana

South: Chandgaon Thana

West: Shikarpur union

Population 
At the 1991 Bangladesh census, Burischar union had a population of 12,860 and 216 house units.

References

Unions of Hathazari Upazila